Halistra, is a small crofting township located on the west coast of the Waternish peninsula, overlooking Loch Bay, on the island of Skye, Scotland. It is in the Scottish council area of Highland. Halistra is a Scandinavian name that implies the Halistra settlement has been present from at least the Viking Age.

References

Populated places in the Isle of Skye